Angola–Turkey relations are the bilateral relations between Angola and Turkey. The Turkish Embassy in Luanda opened on April 1, 2010. The Angolan embassy in Ankara opened on April 4, 2013.

Diplomatic relations 
Turkey recognized Angola in 1975 even though there was pressure from the United States to do otherwise. The Cuban presence in Angola, and SWAPO and ANC bases in Angola led much of the Western world, including the United States to conclude that Angola was becoming a Soviet-sponsored state.

Ignoring Angola's formal commitment to Marxism-Leninism, Turkey and EEC increased foreign assistance grants during the Angolan Civil War.

The Cuban presence in Angola and the South African incursions into Angola determined much of Angola's foreign policy during the 1980s.

During the negotiations to end South Africa’s illegal occupation of Namibia, Turkey tried — in vain — to separate the issues of Namibian independence, Cuban troops in Angola and apartheid. On the grounds that an independent Namibia would enlarge the territory available to countries linked to the Soviet Union, South Africa continued its occupation of Namibia.

Trying to chart a neutral position, Turkey condemned Cuban troops in Angola but also joined Angola in condemning South African incursions into Angola. Trying to rally countries to its side, Turkey pointed out the irony of having Cuban troops guarding American and Turkish companies against attacks by South African commandos that were receiving assistance from the United States.

Economic relations 
Trade volume between the two countries was 212 million USD in 2019.

See also 

 Foreign relations of Angola
 Foreign relations of Turkey

References

Further reading 
 Abshire, David M., and Michael A. Samuels. "The Continuing Crisis in Angola," Current History, 82, No. 482, March 1983, pp. 124-25, 128, 138. 
 Abshire, David M., and Michael A. Samuels (eds.). Portuguese Africa: A Handbook. New York: Praeger, 1969. 
 Gavshon, Arthur. Crisis in Africa: Battleground of East and West. New York: Penguin Books, 1981.
 Ogunbadejo, Oye. "Angola: Ideology and Pragmatism in Foreign Policy," International Affairs [London], 57, Spring 1981, pp. 254-69. 
 Sidler, Peter. "South Africa and the Namibia Question," Swiss Review of World Affairs [Zurich], 38, No. 4. July 1988, pp. 21-22. 
 Smith, Wayne S. "A Trap in Angola," Foreign Policy, No. 62, Spring 1986, pp. 61-74.
 Somerville, Keith. Angola: Politics, Economics, and Society. (Marxist Regimes Series.) Boulder, Colorado: Lynne Rienner, 1986.
 Soremekun, Fola. "Angola." pp. 25–59 in Timothy M. Shaw and Olajide Aluko (eds.), The Political Economy of African Foreign Policy. New York: St. Martin's Press, 1984.
 Wheeler, Douglas L., and Rene Pelissier. Angola. New York: Praeger, 1971.
 Young, Thomas. "Angola: Recent History." pp. 224–28 in Africa  South of the Sahara, 1986. London: Europa, 1985. 

Turkey
Bilateral relations of Turkey